Scott Allen Young (born October 1, 1967) is an American former professional ice hockey right winger and a member of the United States Hockey Hall of Fame. In July 2017 he was named director of player development for the Pittsburgh Penguins.

He is a two-time Stanley Cup champion, winning in  1991 with the Pittsburgh Penguins and 1996 with the Colorado Avalanche. He also played with the Hartford Whalers, Mighty Ducks of Anaheim, St. Louis Blues, and Dallas Stars.

Playing career
Young gained attention as a star hockey player while still in high school. He played his prep school hockey at St. Mark's School in Southborough, Massachusetts, playing with teammates that included fellow future-NHL players Doug and Greg Brown. His play allowed him to play with the United States in the World Junior Ice Hockey Championship in 1985, the beginning of a long international career representing the United States. Following the championship Young went to play for the Boston University Terriers. He played there two years, winning rookie of the year honors in 1986. Young was also drafted by the Hartford Whalers in the first round, 11th overall in the 1986 NHL Entry Draft while still in college.

For the 1987–88 season, Young spent the majority of the season with the U.S. National team. In addition to playing on the national team Young played in the 1988 Winter Olympics and made his debut with the Whalers, playing in seven games. The following season he played full-time with the Whalers, scoring 59 points in 79 games. Young played one more full season with the Whalers and played half of the 1990–91 season with the Whalers before being traded to the Pittsburgh Penguins. Young helped the Penguins win the Stanley Cup in 1991.

For the 1991–92 season Young spent the majority of the year playing in Italy in addition to a brief stint with the U.S. National Team and representing the U.S. in the 1992 Winter Olympics. Prior to 1992–93 season Young returned to the NHL and was traded by the Penguins to the Quebec Nordiques. He played three seasons with the Nordiques and remained on the team when they moved to Colorado and became the Colorado Avalanche. He played two seasons with the Avalanche and won his second Stanley Cup with the Avalanche in 1996. Prior to the 1997–98 season, Young was traded to the Mighty Ducks of Anaheim and played one season with the Ducks. The next offseason Young signed with the St. Louis Blues.

In his first stint with the Blues he played four seasons, enjoying the best season of his career in 2000–01 season, scoring 73 points and 40 goals, both career highs and the only time Young attained 40 goals in a season. Young also represented the U.S. in the 2002 Winter Olympics. Prior to the 2002–03 season Young signed with the Dallas Stars and played two years with them.  Following the cancelled 2004–05 season lockout, Young rejoined the Blues for the 2005–06 campaign. While the Blues finished last in the league that year, Young proved that he was still a strong hockey player, leading the team with 49 points. Following the season, Young retired from hockey. Young finished his career with 1181 career NHL games, 342 goals and 414 assists for 756 points.

Post-retirement
In 2011, Young returned to St. Mark's School in Southborough, Massachusetts, as the coach of the boys' varsity team for which he once played. As a coach, Young had three winning seasons, two Barber Tournament championships and two Boys' Holiday Showcase championships.  The St. Mark's team he helped build won the NEPSAC Small School Championships in 2015 and 2016.

Scott returned to his college alma mater Boston University Terriers as director of hockey operations in 2014. In September 2015, he was promoted to assistant ice hockey coach on head coach David Quinn's staff.

Young was enshrined as a member of the United States Hockey Hall of Fame as part of the Class of 2017. On July 28, 2017 he was appointed director of player development for the NHL's Pittsburgh Penguins.

Career statistics

Regular season and playoffs

International

Awards and honours

See also
List of NHL players with 1000 games played

References

External links

1967 births
American men's ice hockey right wingers
Boston University Terriers men's ice hockey players
Colorado Avalanche players
Dallas Stars players
EV Landshut players
Frankfurt Lions players
Hartford Whalers draft picks
Hartford Whalers players
Ice hockey players from Massachusetts
Ice hockey players at the 1988 Winter Olympics
Ice hockey players at the 1992 Winter Olympics
Ice hockey players at the 2002 Winter Olympics
Living people
Medalists at the 2002 Winter Olympics
Mighty Ducks of Anaheim players
National Hockey League first-round draft picks
Olympic silver medalists for the United States in ice hockey
People from Clinton, Massachusetts
Pittsburgh Penguins coaches
Pittsburgh Penguins players
Quebec Nordiques players
Sportspeople from Worcester County, Massachusetts
St. Louis Blues players
St. Mark's School (Massachusetts) alumni
Stanley Cup champions
United States men's national ice hockey team coaches